John Laing Group plc is a British investor, developer and operator of privately financed, public sector infrastructure projects such as roads, railways, hospitals and schools through Public-Private Partnership (PPP) and Private Finance Initiative (PFI) arrangements. It was listed on the London Stock Exchange and was a constituent of the FTSE 250 Index until the court approved the acquisition of the company by KKR in September 2021.

History
The business can trace its roots back to 1848 when James Laing (born in 1816), along with his wife Ann Graham, and some employees whom they had hired, built a house on a plot of land that they had bought for £30 in Cumberland. The £150 proceeds from the first house financed the building of the next two houses on the same plot of land, one of which (Caldew House in Sebergham) was kept by the Laing family to live in. The family and the business later moved near Carlisle.

When James Laing died in 1882, his son, John Laing (born in 1842) took over the running of the company. John began to undertake larger contracts but confined the business to the Carlisle area. John's son, John William Laing, (born in 1879) was working for the business before he was 20 years old, and so it became John Laing and Son. By 1910, John William Laing was running the business. More employees were recruited and larger projects were undertaken, including factory construction. In 1920, the firm became a limited company, and two years later moved its headquarters from Carlisle to a  site at Mill Hill in north-west London. During the Second World War, the company was one of the contractors engaged in building the Mulberry harbour units. William Kirby Laing and John Maurice Laing, the fifth generation of the founding family, joined the company in 1950. John Laing & Sons (Holdings) Ltd was first listed on the London Stock Exchange in January 1953. The family and its trusts and charities held the majority of the shares. John William Laing became the chairman, and his sons became joint managing directors. By this time, the number of employees was around 10,000, and every site had a quality supervisor. John William Laing retired in 1957. The company acquired Holloway Brothers in 1964.

Under William Kirby Laing and John Maurice Laing, the company continued to expand, winning contracts for power stations and diversifying into road construction while continuing to build houses. In 1985, Martin Laing, of the sixth generation of the founding family, became chairman. Martin Laing determined that the company should begin to diversify. Home construction in the United Kingdom, Saudi Arabia, Oman, the United Arab Emirates, Iraq, Spain, and California was now one of the major sources of the company's growth. As the company celebrated its 150th anniversary in 1998, it faced falling profits caused by cost overruns on the Millennium project and continuing problems within its construction division, related to competition and overcapacity. In 1999, John Laing plc purchased a controlling interest in the Chiltern Railway franchise and by 2002 had structured itself into two main divisions, namely Homes and Investments. It underwent yet another change when Sir Martin Laing retired in early 2002. Bill Forrester took over as executive chairman.

The business expanded rapidly in the late 1990s, such that for the year ended 31 December 2001 its turnover was in excess of £1 billion. Following significant losses on certain construction contracts (particularly the Cardiff Millennium Stadium) the company cut 800 jobs and in 2001 disposed of its construction division to O'Rourke for £1. It focused instead on its PPP / PFI activities. Laing's property developments divisions were sold to Kier Group, and its house building arm was sold to George Wimpey in 2002. In 2003, its affordable housing division was sold in a management buy-out.

In December 2006, John Laing plc was acquired by the private equity arm of Henderson Group. The Laing Rail division - operators of Chiltern Railways and London Overground (with MTR Corporation), and holders of a stake in the open-access railway operator Wrexham & Shropshire - was put up for sale by in September 2007. The division was purchased by German rail operator Deutsche Bahn in January 2008.

In June 2008, John Laing formed a consortium with Hitachi and Barclays Private Equity called Agility Trains to bid for the contract to design, manufacture, and maintain a fleet of long-distance trains for the Intercity Express Programme. The bid was successful and the contract was awarded to the consortium on the 12 February 2009. The company established the John Laing Infrastructure Fund in 2010 in a £270 million public launch. Then in October 2013, the company sold its facilities management business to Carillion. Olivier Brousse was appointed as Chief Executive in March 2014. The John Laing Environmental Fund was established in 2014 in a £174 million public launch. In February 2015, the company became listed on the London Stock Exchange again.

In September 2018, John Laing sold the John Laing Infrastructure Fund Ltd. to Dalmore Capital and Equitix Investment Management. In June 2019, John Laing sold the Investment Advisory Agreement between John Laing Capital Management Ltd. and John Laing Environmental Fund Ltd. to Foresight Group CI Ltd.

On 19 May 2021, Private equity firm KKR said it has agreed to buy British infrastructure investor John Laing Group in a deal valued at about £2 billion ($2.84 billion). John Laing confirmed that it would unanimously recommend to shareholders to back the deal, whose terms it considered to be fair and reasonable. The transaction was approved by the court in September 2021.

Operations

John Laing is a globally-active investor and asset manager, principally for public sector projects that require private finance. The group has offices in Europe, North America, Latin America and Asia Pacific and invests in transport (including road, rail, rolling stock and bridges), social infrastructure (including leisure, healthcare and criminal justice) and renewable energy (including on and offshore solar and wind). The group divides its operations into three areas:

Primary Investment - Sourcing, bidding for and winning greenfield infrastructure projects.

Secondary Investment - Holding operational infrastructure investments, mainly from its own primary investments.

Asset Management - Asset Management services to both the primary and secondary investment portfolios. Asset management skills include: value enhancement; project delivery during the construction phase; technical input; and managed services through Management Services Agreements.

Significant investments
Significant investments include:
The Intercity Express Programme, sold 2018
The Greater Manchester Waste Recycling and Combined Heat & Power Programme
The New Royal Adelaide Hospital
The A1 Autostrada in Poland
The Denver Eagle P3 Project

Former operations

Laing Construction
John Laing’s former construction division, now absorbed into Laing O'Rourke, undertook a number of landmark projects including:

The Chapelhouse Reservoir completed in 1900
Catterick Camp completed in 1930
Shenley Hospital completed in 1932
Warwick Hall in Cumbria completed in 1933
Holme Moss transmitting station completed in 1951
the Spelga Reservoir completed in 1957
the Electra Building in Vancouver completed in 1957
Government House, Victoria completed in 1959
the M1 motorway completed in 1959
Coventry Cathedral completed in 1962
New Century House, Manchester completed in 1962
County Hall, Durham completed in 1963 
the Bull Ring completed in 1964
Carlisle Civic Centre completed in 1964
Lanark County Buildings completed in 1964
Westway completed in 1970
Clifton Cathedral completed in 1973
St Thomas' Hospital North Wing completed in 1975
London Central Mosque completed in 1977
the Freeman Hospital in Newcastle upon Tyne completed in 1977
St David's Hall in Cardiff completed in 1982
Mount Pleasant Airfield completed in 1986
Borders General Hospital completed in 1988
Newcastle Law Courts completed in 1990
the Stansted Airport Terminal Building completed in 1991
Teesside Combined Court Centre completed in 1991
Bradford Law Courts completed in 1993
the Sizewell B nuclear power station completed in 1995
Sheffield Law Courts completed in 1995
the Second Severn Crossing completed in 1996
Bridgewater Hall in Manchester completed in 1996
the British Library completed in 1997
the Millennium Stadium in Cardiff completed in 1999
Norfolk and Norwich University Hospital completed in 2001

Laing Rail
The subsidiary Laing Rail owned and operated Chiltern Railways and was joint operator of London Overground (with MTR Corporation) and Wrexham & Shropshire (with Renaissance Trains). In 2008 Laing Rail was sold to Deutsche Bahn.

Musical reference
Along with Sir Robert McAlpine and George Wimpey, Laing is mentioned in the opening preamble to the 1960 Dominic Behan satirical Irish ballard McAlpine's Fusiliers.

References

Sources

External links
Official site

Construction and civil engineering companies of the United Kingdom
 
British companies established in 1848
2015 initial public offerings
Infrastructure in the United Kingdom
1848 establishments in England
Companies formerly listed on the London Stock Exchange
Construction and civil engineering companies established in 1848
2021 mergers and acquisitions
Private equity portfolio companies